The flavan-4-ols (3-deoxyflavonoids) are flavone-derived alcohols and a family of flavonoids. Flavan-4-ols are colorless precursor compounds that polymerize to form red phlobaphene pigments. They can be found in the sorghum. Glycosides (abacopterins A, B, C and D together with triphyllin A and 6,8-dimethyl-7-hydroxy-4‘-methoxyanthocyanidin-5-O-β-d-glucopyranoside) can be isolated from a methanol extract of the rhizomes of Abacopteris penangiana.

Known flavan-4-ols
 Apiforol
 Luteoforol

Metabolism
Flavanone 4-reductase is an enzyme that uses (2S)-flavan-4-ol and NADP+ to produce (2S)-flavanone, NADPH, and H+.

Spectral data
These compounds have absorption maxima of 564 nm.

References